The Venice–Inglewood Line is a former Pacific Electric interurban railway line in Los Angeles County, California. Service was very sparse, providing a suburban route between Venice and Inglewood.

History

California Central
The branch line was built by the Atchison, Topeka and Santa Fe Railway, opening in June 1887 from Inglewood to Port Ballona (on the site of today’s Playa del Rey).

Santa Fe and Santa Monica
The oceanside terminal was moved to Ocean Park, under the April 4, 1892 charter of the Santa Fe and Santa Monica "to build from a point at or near 'Mesmer Station' on line of Southern California Railway Company between Inglewood and Ballona, Los Angeles County, to Town of Santa Monica."

Los Angeles Pacific & Pacific Electric 
The route was acquired by the Los Angeles Pacific Railroad on March 21, 1902, and was shortly after electrified for service by that October. Service was limited to a single daily car. After Pacific Electric absorbed the company in 1911, service consisted of a single round trip mixed train (combined passenger and freight) daily except Sunday, when additional trains were run. Passenger trips ended after September 13, 1928.

Southern Pacific
According to Abandoned Rails, “The line also served produce warehouses and other small businesses until the 1960s. Under the ownership of the Southern Pacific, most of the rails remained in place until 1977.” In 1976, Southern Pacific applied to abandon the track past Alla through Machado to Venice.

All tracks along the route had been removed or paved over by 1981. Though much of the right-of-way has been built over, most of it has not been merged with neighboring parcels. The former route can be traced through a series of oddly-shaped, narrow structures, parking lots, and strips of vacant land. The former embankment can still be seen along the south side of Rogers Park in Inglewood.

Depot 

Inglewood Depot was built in 1887 and survived until the 1970s when it was demolished following an arson fire.

Route
The Venice–Inglewood Line was a single-track line in a private right of way. The line originated at the Pacific Electric Inglewood station and the Atchison, Topeka and Santa Fe Railway junction at Ivy Avenue and Ballona Street in Inglewood.

From the station, the line ran westerly and northwesterly following intermittent sections of Ballona Street, Hyde Park Boulevard and Thorneburn Street while crossing La Cienega Boulevard at-grade and passing under La Tijera Boulevard. The section of right-of-way from La Cienega to Centinela remains as a vacant strip parallel to the Centinela Creek flood control channel, with the undercrossing beneath La Tijera still visible. The section east of La Cienega has been partially developed with a storage facility, but continues along the north side of Oak street as an empty strip planted with trees and grass. 

Continuing northwesterly, the line ran approximately  before paralleling Centinela Avenue (on the south) and crossing Sepulveda Boulevard at-grade. Following Centinela Avenue, the single track line curved westerly and southwesterly to run between Centinela and the Hughes Airport. The line ran between the runaways and the south side of Centinela–Jefferson Boulevard. It then crossed Jefferson Boulevard to head northwesterly and cross Ballona Creek. Nothing remains of most of this section, as the Hughes Airport was redeveloped into the Playa Vista neighborhood. However a small portion of the right-of-way remains on the south side of Centinela just west of Sepulveda, as a derelict strip of dirt that interrupts the sidewalk, and support columns for the crossing are still visible in Ballona Creek.

The Venice–Inglewood Line continued northwesterly from Ballona Creek crossing Culver Boulevard and the adjacent Redondo Beach via Playa del Rey Line at-grade to Alla Wye. It then ran adjacent to California State Route 90 on a separate right of way which remains vacant. Next, the track crossed Lincoln Boulevard (where a small section of track is still visible) and ran northwesterly to follow intermittent sections of Oxford Avenue while crossing Washington Street and then Washington Boulevard. This portion of track was subdivided for residential development, creating a long row of unusually small, narrow houses along Oxford Avenue.

The line then crossed Venice Boulevard (with the Venice Short Line) and continued northwesterly following the west side of Electric Avenue through Venice to cross Main Street and reach the terminus of the line at the Ocean Park Carhouse (west of Main Street between Paloma and Thornton Avenues in Venice, a site which would later house a Metro bus yard). Another source mentions a Santa Monica terminus at 5th Avenue (and Electric).

Ridership
While the Santa Fe experienced strong initial ridership on the line, declining passenger loads contributed to the company's decision to sell the route. A survey by the California Railroad Commission for the week ending September 3, 1927 revealed that a single passenger had ridden the line in the time period; eight trips were made the entire month.

Gallery

References

External links

 The Militant's Pacific Electric Archaeology Map - old PE Streetcar lines shown on contemporary map

Photos
 LAPL photo collection: Electric trolley "Inglewood only" - jobs for GIs
 Color photos of a Red Car on the Venice–Inglewood line, possibly 1940s
 Inglewood train station 1969
 Electric Train Arriving Venice 1911
 

Pacific Electric routes
Light rail in California
Railway lines opened in 1887
1887 establishments in California
Railway services discontinued in 1928
1928 disestablishments in California
Closed railway lines in the United States
Inglewood, California
Playa Vista, Los Angeles
Marina del Rey, California
Venice, Los Angeles
Westside (Los Angeles County)
Ballona Creek